Erechtites hieraciifolius (fireweed, American burnweed, or pilewort) is a plant in the daisy family, Asteraceae. It is native to the Americas, but is found many places around the world having been introduced by human activity. It is introduced in Hawaii, China, and Southeast Asia.

Description
Erechtites hieraciifolius is an annual herb with alternate, simple leaves, on thick, green stems.  The leaves are serrated, and range from unlobed to deeply lobed, with the lobe pattern superficially resembling wild lettuces, which are in the same family but not closely related. When crushed, all parts of the species are aromatic. The flower heads are yellow or pink, borne in fall.  The heads are followed by cluster of small, wispy achenes.  The plant often branches and grows in a clump with multiple stems.

Ecology
This species benefits from fire, and is often one of the earliest pioneer species of areas that have recently burned, hence some of its common names. It prefers moist sites but can handle gravelly soil and some degree of dry conditions. It also grows well in urban areas and around humans.

The flowers are pollinated primarily by wasps and honey bees Apis mellifera. The seeds are wind-dispersed, and are used as a minor food source by birds.

Varieties
 Erechtites hieraciifolius var. cacalioides (Fisch. ex Spreng.) Less. ex Griseb. - Mexico, Central America, West Indies, South America
 Erechtites hieraciifolius var. hieraciifolius  - North America, West Indies
 Erechtites hieraciifolius var. megalocarpus (Fernald) Cronquist - northeastern United States from Massachusetts to New Jersey

References

External links
United States Department of Agriculture Plants Profile
photo of herbarium specimen at Missouri Botanical Garden, collected in Brazil in 1964
photo of herbarium specimen at Missouri Botanical Garden, collected in Peru in 1986
photo taken by Gerrit Davidse, showing one specimen of Homo sapiens beside one specimen of Erechtites hieraciifolius

Senecioneae
Flora of North America
Flora of South America
Plants described in 1753
Taxa named by Carl Linnaeus